South Dum Dum is a city and a municipality of North 24 Parganas district in the Indian state of West Bengal. It is a part of the area covered by Kolkata Metropolitan Development Authority (KMDA) and a vital locality in Kolkata Metropolitan Area.

It is a city on the outskirts of North Kolkata with a municipality called South Dum Dum municipality. It is well connected to the developed part of the city through railways and roads. It is very near to Kolkata Airport, Shyambazar (epicenter of North Kolkata), Newtown (the IT hub of Kolkata), Esplanade (the employment hub of Kolkata and central business district). It is well connected to Alipore, Ballygunge and Jadavpur by suburban railways.

Etymology 

During the 19th century Dum Dum area was home to the Dum Dum Arsenal, a British Royal Artillery facility.

History

South Dum Dum Municipality was established in 1870.

With the partition of Bengal in 1947, "millions of refugees poured in from erstwhile East Pakistan." In the initial stages, the bulk of these refugees were non-agriculturists. A few of them made their own arrangements, but "it was squatters who made the East Bengali refugees famous or infamous." Squatting (jabardakhal in Bengali) ranged from the forcible occupation of barracks to the collective take-over of private, government, and wasteland. By 1949, there were a total of 65 refugee colonies in the Dum Dum and Panihati zones. The squatters were in a way "self-settlers" in the absence of adequate official arrangements for rehabilitation. Within a very short time, the refugees (quite often with government/administrative support) not only found a place to stay but developed a society that included markets, schools, temples and sometimes even colleges, hospitals and recreational centres.

Clive House on Rastraguru Avenue in Nagerbazar is mired in controversy. It is thought of as the first pucca brick and cement building in North Kolkata area and was possibly built by the Portuguese. Some say that it was the hunting lodge of an Indian prince or nobleman. What is known is that it was used by British soldiers when they first entered the country. Later, Robert Clive took the area over, renovated it, added a floor to the single-story building, and made it his country house around 1757-60. The house is located on raised ground in otherwise flat surroundings. When Clive House was excavated, a variety of artefacts were recovered, including coins, terracotta figures, sculptures, pottery and intelligence on a Portuguese fort. The articles found could be of the Sen period, or may alternatively have links with the ancient civilization unearthed earlier at Chandraketugarh. Clive House has been in the domain of the Archaeological Survey of India since 2004, but squatters inside and outside the structure have hindered restoration work.

Geography

Location 

South Dum Dum is bounded by North Dumdum (Municipality) and Dum Dum (Municipality) on the north, Baguiati and adjacent areas of VIP Road on the east, Salt Lake on the south and Belgachia and Sinthee in Kolkata district and Baranagar (Municipality) on the west.

South Dum Dum consists of localities such as Nagerbazar, Amarpally, Motijheel, Subhas Nagar, Bediapara, Jheelbagan, Jawpore, Ghughudanga, Purba Sinthee, Seth Bagan, Kalindi, Lake Town, Bangur Avenue, Shyamnagar, Satgachhi, Patipukur, Dakshindari, Dum Dum Park etc.

96% of the population of Barrackpore subdivision (partly presented in the map alongside, all places marked on the map are linked in the full screen map) lives in urban areas. In 2011, it had a density of population of 10,967 per km2. The subdivision has 16 municipalities and 24 census towns. For most of the cities/towns, information regarding the density of population is available in the Infobox. Population data is not available for neighbourhoods. It is available for the entire municipal area and thereafter ward-wise.

Police station 
Dum Dum police station under Barrackpore Police Commissionerate has jurisdiction over Dum Dum and parts of South Dum Dum Municipal areas. Lake Town police station under Bidhannagar Police Commissionerate also has jurisdiction over parts of South Dum Dum.

Post Offices 
South Dum Dum is a vast locality with many Postal Index Numbers:

Motijheel has a delivery sub post office, with PIN 700074 in the Kolkata North Division of Kolkata district in Calcutta region. Other post offices with the same PIN are Dum Dum Road and Jawpore.

Sethbagan has a non-delivery sub post office, with PIN 700030 in the Kolkata North Division of Kolkata district in Calcutta region. Other post offices with the same PIN are Purba Sinthee and Ghughudanga.

Subhas Nagar has a non-delivery sub post office, with PIN 700065 in the Kolkata North Division of Kolkata district in Calcutta region. Other post office with the same PIN is Health Institute. Bediapara has a delivery sub post office, with PIN 700077 in the Kolkata North Division of Kolkata district in Calcutta region.

Nagerbazar has a non-delivery sub-post office, with PIN 700028 in the Kolkata North Division of Kolkata district in Calcutta region. Another post office with the same PIN is Jugipara Satgachhi.

Bangur Avenue has a delivery sub-post office, with PIN 700055 in the Kolkata East Division of North 24 Parganas district in Calcutta region. Other post offices with the same PIN are Dum Dum Park and Shyamnagar.

Lake Town has a delivery sub-post office, with PIN 700089 in the Kolkata East Division of North 24 Parganas district in Calcutta region. Another post office with the same PIN is Kalindi Housing Estate.

Patipukur has a non-delivery sub-post office, with PIN 700048 in the Kolkata East Division of North 24 Parganas district in Calcutta region. Other post offices with the same PIN are Sreebhumi and Sadhana Ausudhalaya Road (Dakshindari).

Demographics

Population 
As per the 2011 Census of India, South Dum Dum had a total population of 403,316, of which 202,214 (50%) were males and 201,102 (50%) were females. Population below 6 years was 28,703. The total number of literates in South Dum Dum was 344,971 (92.09% of the population over 6 years).

 India census, South Dumdum had a population of 392,150. Males constitute 51% of the population and females 49%. South Dum Dum has an average literacy rate of 83%, higher than the national average of 59.5%: male literacy is 87%, and female literacy is 80%. In South Dum Dum, 8% of the population is under 6 years of age.

Religion

Kolkata Urban Agglomeration 
The following Municipalities, Census Towns and other locations in Barrackpore subdivision were part of Kolkata Urban Agglomeration in the 2011 census: Kanchrapara (M), Jetia (CT), Halisahar (M), Balibhara (CT), Naihati (M), Bhatpara (M), Kaugachhi (CT), Garshyamnagar (CT), Garulia (M), Ichhapur Defence Estate (CT), North Barrackpur (M), Barrackpur Cantonment (CB), Barrackpore (M), Jafarpur (CT), Ruiya (CT), Titagarh (M), Khardaha (M), Bandipur (CT), Panihati (M), Muragachha (CT) New Barrackpore (M), Chandpur (CT), Talbandha (CT), Patulia (CT), Kamarhati (M), Baranagar (M), South Dum Dum (M), North Dumdum (M), Dum Dum (M), Noapara (CT), Babanpur (CT), Teghari (CT), Nanna (OG), Chakla (OG), Srotribati (OG) and Panpur (OG).

Economy 

South Dum Dum municipality is included in the Kolkata Metropolitan Area for which the KMDA is the statutory planning and development authority.

Education
The following institutions are located in South Dum Dum:

Dr. Sudhir Chandra Sur Degree Engineering College, established by the JIS Educational Initiatives at Dum Dum in 2009 offers degree, diploma and post graduate courses in engineering. It is affiliated to Makaut 
 Dum Dum Motijheel College was established in Dum Dum in 1950. The college runs in two shifts. The women's section has classes in the morning and the coeducational section has classes during the day. Both the sections offer various subjects. The college has a post graduate unit in M.Sc. mathematics and M.A. English. It offers a vocational course in instrumentation.
 Dum Dum Motijheel Rabindra Mahavidyalaya was established at Dum Dum in 1968.It was started as an evening college in commerce, became a day college in commerce in 1974 and finally a general day college, with arts, science, and commerce courses, in 2004. It offers B.Com (Hons) in marketing, geography honours in B.Sc. and Journalism honours in B.A.
East Calcutta Girl's College, Lake Town
Ramakrishna Sarada Mission Vivekananda Vidyabhavan was established by Ramakrishna Sarada Mission at Dum Dum in 1961. It is a partly residential college for women. It offers honours courses in Bengali, English, Sanskrit, education, history, philosophy, political science, sociology, journalism & mass communication, economics and geography.
Indian College of Arts and Draftsmanship, was established at Dum Dum in 1893. It offers courses in painting, applied arts, sculpture and graphics. It is affiliated with Rabindra Bharati University.
Dum Dum Krishna Kumar Hindu Academy, at Motijheel Avenue, Amarpalli, is a boys only Bengali-medium higher secondary school. It has arrangements for teaching from Classes VI – XII. It was established in 1933.
Dum Dum Kishore Bharati High School, Motijheel Avenue, in Ward No. 9, South Dum Dum Municipality, is a boys only Bengali-medium higher secondary school. It has arrangements for teaching from Classes VI – XII. It was established in 1965.>
Dum Dum Motijheel Girls' High School, at Dum Dum Road, is a girls’ only high school, under WB board, providing higher secondary education.
Dum Dum Prachya Banimandir for Boys and Dum Dum Prachya Banimandir for Girls at Seth Bagan. Schools are different for both genders and is a higher secondary school.
Dum Dum Sri Aurabinda Vidyamandir in Khudiram Colony is a co-educational higher secondary school.
Krishnapur Adarsha Vidyamandir, at Dum Dum Park, in Ward No. 28, is a boys only Bengali-medium higher secondary school. It has facilities for teaching in Classes VI to XII. It was established in 1954. About 3000 students studies in this school and popular as one of the best school in the State. The school is fully controlled under cctv surveillance.
Sahid Rameswar Vidyamandir, Jessore Road, Amarpalli, is a co-educational, higher secondary school.
Seth Bagan Adarsha Vidyamandir is a co-educational, higher secondary school.
Christchurch Girls' High School, Jessore Road, is a Bengali-medium, girls only school preparing students for madhyamik and higher secondary examination of the West Bengal boards. Established in 1882, it has arrangements for teaching from Infant to Class XII. Admission for Primary section starts around December. It has hostel facilities.
St. Mary's Orphanage & Day School, Kolkata, was initially set up by Christian Brothers from Ireland at Murgighata in Calcutta in 1848 and shifted to Dum Dum Road in 1947. It is a boys only institution and prepares students for the ICSE and ISC examinations.

Healthcare 
South Dum Dum Maternity Home functions with 15 beds.

ILS Hospital, near Nagerbazar Flyover, is a 120-bed multi-speciality hospital. It offers 14 surgical facilities and 2 speciality clinics – bariatric (weight-loss) and diabetic.

A new municipality hospital is under construction, located on Jessore Road, near Shyamnagar Bus stop. Though the work is halted for many years due to some issues.

Market and entertainment 
Major markets in South Dum Dum:

 Nagerbazar market
 Dumdum station market
 Dumdum Road market
 Patipukur Fish market 
 Kalindi, Laketown market
 Gorabazar market
 Dumdum Park market
 Diamond Plaza mall

Entertainment areas:

 Diamond Plaza mall
 Indira Maidan
Rabindra Bhawan
Amal Duta Krirangan

Transport
NH 12 (previously NH 34), running from Dalkhola to Bakkhali, locally popular as Jessore Road, passes through South Dum Dum. In 2012, a flyover was opened from Amarpally to Nagerbazar Sarojini Naidu Women College to decongest the heavy traffic on Jessore Road towards Dumdum/Kolkata Airport.
 
Several buses ply on Jessore Road, Dum Dum Road and Lake Town Road.

Dum Dum Junction railway station, on the Sealdah-Ranaghat line, is 7 km from Sealdah railway station. It is part of the Kolkata Suburban Railway system. Two lines branch out after Dum Dum Junction railway station – the Calcutta Chord line linking Dum Dum Junction railway station with Dankuni Junction railway station and the Sealdah-Bangaon line.

Kolkata Metro, the first underground metro in India, was initially constructed from Dum Dum to Tollygunge. It was progressively commissioned, the full length of 16.45 km being commissioned in 1995. Dum Dum metro station is located adjacent to Dum Dum Junction railway station.

Travel within South Dum Dum and Dum Dum

There are a plenty of private buses, mini-buses and taxis, as well as a few WBTC buses in South Dum Dum. Autos are plentiful and can be used for short stretches.

Nagerbazar is the hub of autos where there are 4 routes originates viz:

1) Nagerbazar - Dum Dum Junction,

2) Nagerbazar - Dum Dum Cantonment,

3) Nagerbazar - Airport 1 no. gate,

4) Nagerbazar - Lake Town.

In addition, there are taxis: Nagerbazar has a large taxi stand. The other popular means of travel over short distances is the rickshaw, newly battery operated rickshaws (locally called Totos) can also be seen.

Travel within South Dum Dum and North Dum Dum

See also 

 Dum Dum
 North Dumdum
 Barrackpore subdivision

References

External links 

 South Dum Dum Municipality website

Cities and towns in North 24 Parganas district
Neighbourhoods in Kolkata
Kolkata Metropolitan Area
Cities in West Bengal